Mark Kelly (born 27 November 1969 in Basingstoke) is a former professional footballer who played for Portsmouth and also won four caps for the Republic of Ireland.

Club career
Portsmouth manager Alan Ball described the 18-year-old Kelly as "the next George Best" but despite some exciting performances a series of injuries prevented him from becoming fully established in the first team. He made his debut for Portsmouth as a substitute away to West Ham United in February 1988.

He never recovered from a serious knee injury sustained in 1991 and was forced to retire a year later, after a brief trial at Tottenham Hotspur in a bid to resurrect his career. Later he played part-time for Sligo Rovers and Farnborough Town.

International career
Although born in Basingstoke, Mark played for the Republic of Ireland through the parentage rule after being recommended to manager Jack Charlton. His first cap came on 27 April 1988, aged just 18, in a 2-0 friendly win over Yugoslavia at Lansdowne Road . He won his first cap a month before he made his full debut at club level.

Coaching
Kelly worked as head of youth development at his former club, Portsmouth before leaving the club in October 2009. He eventually returned to Pompey on 18 June 2014, being appointed Academy manager.

Media work
Kelly joined BBC Radio Solent at the start of the 2011/12 season as their match summariser for live commentaries on Portsmouth matches.

See also
 List of Republic of Ireland international footballers born outside the Republic of Ireland

References

External links
Mark Kelly SoccerScene.ie

1969 births
Living people
English footballers
Association football midfielders
Republic of Ireland association footballers
Republic of Ireland international footballers
Republic of Ireland under-21 international footballers
Republic of Ireland under-23 international footballers
Republic of Ireland B international footballers
Republic of Ireland youth international footballers
Portsmouth F.C. players
Sligo Rovers F.C. players
Farnborough F.C. players
Finn Harps F.C. players
League of Ireland players
Portsmouth F.C. non-playing staff